Vagococcus elongatus is a Gram-positive bacterium from the genus of Vagococcus which has been isolated from a swine manure storage pit from the United States.

References 

Lactobacillales
Bacteria described in 2007